Ian Bishop may refer to:

Ian Bishop (cricketer) (born 1967), West Indian Test cricketer
Ian Bishop (English cricketer) (born 1977), English first-class cricketer
Ian Bishop (footballer) (born 1965), former football midfielder
Ian Bishop (priest) (born 1962), Archdeacon of Macclesfield